The Nemesis, also called the Nemesis-T Type, the Pursuer or the , is a character in Resident Evil (Biohazard in Japan), a survival horror video game series created by Japanese company Capcom. Although smaller than other Tyrant models, the creature dwarfs a typical human, and possesses vastly superior intelligence and physical dexterity to its undead peers. It is featured in Resident Evil 3: Nemesis (1999) as a titular main villain before later emerging in other titles and cameo roles. It is also featured on various merchandise and was portrayed by Matthew G. Taylor in the 2004 film Resident Evil: Apocalypse. The character is voiced by Tony Rosato in the original game and Gregg Berger in Operation Raccoon City (2012). In the 2020 remake of Resident Evil 3, the character is voiced by David Cockman, while Neil Newbon provided the motion capture performance. Nemesis has also been featured in several other game franchises, including as a playable character in Marvel vs. Capcom and Dead by Daylight.

Since the Nemesis' introduction, the character has received a positive reception and has come to be regarded as one of the series' most popular characters, but his design and role in the Resident Evil 3 remake were criticized. Some publications have praised its role as an intimidating villain, while others have noted it as one of their favourite and most terrifying monsters in video games.

Conception and design
Introduced in Resident Evil 3: Nemesis, the Nemesis-T Type was designed under the concept of a "huge, overpowering monster that could use weapons and intelligently track you anywhere." During development, many different designs were considered. Although some elements remained constant among them, the early designs featured several different degrees of surface damage, as well as different options for clothing such as a protective vest instead of a coat or a nude design similar to the original Tyrant from Resident Evil.

In the series' story, the Nemesis-T Type is the result of infecting a T-103 model Tyrant – a humanoid bio-weapon created to be the ultimate lifeform—with the Nemesis Alpha parasite (or "NE-α") designed to increase its intelligence. The parasite's origins are partially retconned in the 2020 remake to be a genetically engineered copy of the Las Plagas parasite, which was introduced in Resident Evil 4. Upon infection, the parasite takes control of the Tyrant's nervous system, forming its own brain and enabling it to follow precise instructions and make decisions without a need for constant direction. Clothed in black trousers, an overcoat, boots, and gloves, the Nemesis is armed with a rocket launcher mounted on its left arm. To emphasize its design as a prototype, the game developers left exposed muscles on its body and added stitches to cover the right eye. Upon spotting its target, it says the target's name out loud and attacks.

The secretions from the parasite give the Nemesis massively heightened regenerative abilities, which result in the creature being almost impervious to damage; although it can be put down with enough fire from small arms, eventually it will repair itself and resume the pursuit of its targets. However, this resulted in unexpected side effects, including damage to the skin and the emergence of additional tentacles, as well as unpredictable mutations caused by further attacks. In Resident Evil 3, the creature's survival instincts eventually override Nemesis' programming, causing the host's body to reject the parasite and transform into a giant digestive organ. Featuring large central bone protrusions and elongated tentacles, it crawls looking for prey, yet continues trying to complete its mission despite its now diminished intelligence. This design proved to be the most difficult for the game's development team, as they worked to try to make it appear as unique as possible. In 2020 remake of Resident Evil 3, according to producer Peter Fabiano, "During development, our director saw what the team did with Tyrant in last year's RE2 and was determined to surpass that with Nemesis." He also goes on to say that the team intends to transform Nemesis into its own brand of terror, "a relentless pursuer with its own arsenal of weapons."

Appearances

In video games
The Nemesis, named after the Goddess of Vengeance from Greek mythology, first appears in the 1999 PlayStation game Resident Evil 3: Nemesis as the game's title character and primary antagonist. The product of years of research, the prototype is deployed by the Umbrella Corporation as a field test to hunt and kill the STARS police team before they can expose Umbrella's activity in the Arklay mountains. The game’s protagonist, Jill Valentine, first encounters the Nemesis outside Raccoon City’s police station where it kills Brad Vickers and then pursues her, uttering "STARS..." on sight. The Nemesis continues to stalk Valentine throughout the game, attacking with physical blows and grabs, and later, armed with a rocket launcher. After losing its overcoat as a result of heavy damage, the Nemesis mutates, and gains the ability to attack with long, extendable tentacles. Despite later being doused in acid, the Nemesis continues its pursuit, and mutates into a much larger, tentacled monster after absorbing a dead Tyrant, gaining the ability to spew poison. Jill finally defeats the Nemesis using a rail cannon, and then depending on the choice of the player, she either kills it once and for all by unloading her weapons into it, or leaves it to die in the nuclear explosion that destroys Raccoon City. A similar Nemesis later appears in Resident Evil Survivor 2 – Code: Veronica, chasing the player if they fail to complete a level before the time limit expires and killing them instantly if it hits them; it can also be fought as a secret boss armed with a rocket launcher if the player has met the proper conditions upon completing the game. The Nemesis returns for the Resident Evil 3 chapter of Resident Evil: The Umbrella Chronicles, in which it pursues Jill in the same manner as the original game and mutates into its secondary form as a boss.  The Nemesis also appears in Resident Evil: Operation Raccoon City. In the game, the Nemesis' programming is damaged and the USS is tasked with finding a NE-Alpha parasite to repair it. Once the parasite is found, the players must defeat the Nemesis and inject it with the parasite. The Nemesis in the game uses a gatling gun for the fight and is mainly based on his film counterpart; however once the mission is completed, the Nemesis awakes to find his rocket launcher and proceeds to hunt after the STARS police team. In the 2020 remake of Resident Evil 3, Nemesis returns as the game's first boss fight, wielding a flamethrower. Nemesis also appeared as a playable character in Resident Evil: Resistance and in Resident Evil Re:Verse, which is a companion game to Resident Evil Village.

The character has been featured in other games outside of the Resident Evil franchise as well, such as in the Capcom title Under the Skin alongside Jill, and serves as a boss the player must steal coins from in a Raccoon City-inspired level. Character cards for the Nemesis additionally appear in SVC: Card Fighters' Clash 2 Expand Edition and its Nintendo DS sequel. In an interview, Marvel vs. Capcom 3: Fate of Two Worlds producer Ryouta Niitsuma stated a desire to use the Nemesis in the title as a "monster-type" character from the Resident Evil series, but was dropped after considering it too "grotesque and disgusting" and in consideration of ESRB ratings. The character would instead appear briefly in the game's ending sequence for the Hulk. However, despite the initial concerns about his inclusion, the Nemesis appears as a playable character in Ultimate Marvel vs. Capcom 3, an updated version of Marvel vs. Capcom 3. The Nemesis returns as a playable character in Marvel vs. Capcom: Infinite. In the game's story, following the Convergence, it is captured by A.I.M.brella leader M.O.D.O.K. and reprogrammed as his enforcer; it later battles and is defeated by Chris Redfield and Mike Haggar. In the tactical role-playing game Project X Zone, Nemesis appears as a rival unit. Nemesis appeared in an online multiplayer battle royale game Knives Out as a costume at July 29 to August 12, 2021. Nemesis, along with Leon S. Kennedy and Jill Valentine, appeared in Dead by Daylight as playable characters. His "Nemesis Blight Set" skin were also included.

In film
The Nemesis is featured in the 2004 film, Resident Evil: Apocalypse, portrayed by Matthew G. Taylor. The character's design was left relatively unchanged, brandishing a rocket launcher and similar attire, but with the addition of a forearm-mounted rail gun, modeled after a heavily modified minigun. Writer and producer Paul W. S. Anderson noted that the gun's addition was inspired by the idea of the Nemesis "walking around with a gigantic, powerful weapon in each hand and almost indecisive as to which one to use". After production of Apocalypse was completed, the costume was restored and put on display at Kropserkel's offices.

While The Nemesis' design remained similar, the character itself was expanded upon, now portrayed as a tragic villain. Formerly Matt Addison (portrayed by Eric Mabius), a survivor of the events of the first film, he was infected with the T-virus after being scratched by a Licker and later captured and experimented upon by the Umbrella Corporation. Transformed into the Nemesis, he is sent to kill the surviving members of STARS, but remembers his humanity after fighting Alice, and fights alongside the protagonists towards the film's conclusion. The Nemesis is eventually crushed beneath a crashing helicopter, and is later killed by the nuclear explosion that destroys Raccoon City.

In printed adaptations
The Nemesis appears in a 1999 Hong Kong manhua adaptation of Resident Evil 3 by Lee Chung Hing, Biohazard 3: Last Escape, which is named after the game's Japanese title. The 27-issue series adds to the Nemesis' backstory, detailing its origin by showing the infection and transformation of the original Tyrant by the Nemesis parasite. Some elements are changed for its design, such as the Nemesis retaining both eyes initially, and then losing the right eye and gaining cranial staples only after an encounter with Jill. The comic also introduces characters from Resident Evil 2 into the storyline, which results in a face-off between the Nemesis and the mutated William Birkin towards the end of the series.

In 2000, Simon & Schuster published a novelization of Resident Evil 3, written by S. D. Perry. Though left unchanged for the most part, the Nemesis is immediately recognized as a modified Tyrant in the novel, which Jill Valentine dubs the "Nemesis" after thinking about why it hunts her. Instead of mutating due to having taken damage, the Nemesis transforms voluntarily towards the conclusion of the story in its pursuit of Jill, with its second form from the game being its actual appearance beneath the coat.

A novelization of Apocalypse was released in 2004, written by Keith R. A. DeCandido. In the book, Matt and the Nemesis act as separate personalities in the same body, both aware, but with the Nemesis dominant. Matt eventually regains control after his body is impaled on a metal shard while fighting Alice, by showing the Nemesis his memories of Umbrella's experimentation upon "them". The Nemesis is later mentioned in the 2007 novelization of Resident Evil: Extinction, in which antagonist Doctor Isaacs considers the Nemesis both his greatest success and his greatest failure, hating mention of it and blaming its defection and destruction upon Umbrella's desire to immediately field test it.

Promotion and reception
Nemesis appears on the cover of every version of Resident Evil 3, and is mentioned prominently on flyers for Resident Evil: Survivor 2. Capcom has also released commercial products modeled on the character, such as an adult size Halloween mask, and later a silver ring modeled after Nemesis's head available for purchase through their Japanese online store. Palisades Toys used its likeness to create a posable action figure (packaged with a base and equipable rocket launcher) and a mini bust, which were released alongside several other Resident Evil-based merchandise. Moby Dick released its own line of Resident Evil action figures bundled in pairs of a playable character and enemy. Included in the series were Nemesis's first and second form, with the first form featuring an alternate head and equipable rocket launcher. Each set additionally includes a part of an action figure of Nemesis's third form, which measures 24 inches (60 cm) long when completed. In 2019, a minted icon 9-inch plush depicting Nemesis was also made. In 2022, Numskull made a collectible figurine of Nemesis.

Following the game's debut in 1999, the Nemesis became one of the most recognizable and popular characters in the Resident Evil series. G4's Filter named the Nemesis one of the top ten videogame villains of all time as selected by viewers, placing fifth on the list. IGN noted it as their favorite aspect of Resident Evil 3, stating, "The point is, he's a bad-ass, and he's got plenty of surprises in store for you besides just fast feet and a big gun". In another article, IGN noted the Nemesis as one of their favorite video game monsters of all time, but felt disdain for its presentation in the film. They also named him one of the series' best bosses, calling it "what may be Umbrella's most fearsome creation ever" and comparing it to Terminator 2: Judgment Days T-1000, and later one of the top 100 video game villains of all time, placing 59th and described as horrific not for its appearance or attacks but its persistence. 1UP.com named the battle against the Nemesis one of the "25 of the Most Badass Boss Fights of All Time", saying "There are plenty of bosses worth mentioning from the Resident Evil series... but the one that to this day most people point to as the biggest badass of the bunch is Nemesis". GamePro ranked the Nemesis 29th on their list of the "47 Most Diabolical Video Game Villains of All Time", noting the character "made RE3 memorable even among the other, superior installments in the series". It ranked fourth on Electronic Gaming Monthly's "Top Ten Badass Undead" article, which described its role as a simple, yet effective villain. GameSpot featured Nemesis in a "Reader's Choice" edition of their "Top 10 Video Game Villains" article, placing eighth on the list and noting the character's high popularity among fans when compared to the Tyrant. He has also been voted by GamesRadars readers as the 99th "most dastardly ne'er-do-wells" villain in video games in their "top 100". GameDaily listed it as one of their favorite Capcom characters of all time, stating "The Resident Evil series has a slew of memorable bad guys to choose from... but Nemesis is our favorite," and was also named one of their favorite undead characters in video games. The Nemesis additionally ranked fifth on their list of "Top 25 Scariest Video Game Monsters". Aaron Potter of Den of Geek named Nemesis as second of their "Best Resident Evil Bosses and Monsters", stating that "He becomes more deformed the longer Resident Evil 3’s campaign progresses, too, making each fight feel scarier than the last. Nemesis has only ever returned in spin-offs, but you never know when he’ll pop around the corner next."  IGN also described Nemesis as one of their favorite video game monsters of all time, stating that "what made us love Nemesis made it through to his film incarnation. As it runs out, a man in a rubber suit isn't half as scary as a well-crafted collection of polygons." IGN staff also named Nemesis as one of the best Resident Evil bosses of all time. Red Bull called Nemesis one of the scariest video game villains of all time, because he "constantly stalks you through the game. You cannot kill him, you cannot stop him. At best you can run away and even that isn’t always effective. Oh, and he can use a rocket launcher too."

Nemesis's appearance in Resident Evil 3 Remake has received mixed reviews from critics. It has been criticized by fans, who are unhappy with his new look. Hirun Cryer of Eurogamer described Nemesis's "large fangs and smooshed nose" as "cartoonish." Ben Tyrer of GamesRadar downplayed Nemesis's appearance and stated that "Resident Evil 3s main villain has lost his fear factor," while Andy Kelly of PC Gamer described Nemesis as "giant and terrifying stalker in town." Kirk McKeand of VG247 explained that Nemesis is only active in a small portion of the game, and that he is primarily featured in scripted sequences or boss fights. This led some critics to believe that he was underused and that a lot of his potential was wasted.

References

External links
 Details behind the Nemesis costume used in Apocalypse

Capcom antagonists
Cyborg characters in video games
Fictional characters with dissociative identity disorder
Fictional hybrid life forms
Fictional parasites and parasitoids
Fictional mass murderers
Fictional monsters
Fictional super soldiers
Genetically engineered characters in video games
Male horror film villains
Mutant characters in video games
Resident Evil characters
Zombie and revenant characters in video games
Video game bosses
Video game characters introduced in 1999
Video game characters with accelerated healing
Video game characters with superhuman strength
Video game mascots
Weapons of mass destruction in fiction
Science fiction weapons